The Ultimate Sin is the fourth studio album by English heavy metal vocalist Ozzy Osbourne. It was released on 24 January 1986, and was remastered and re-issued on compact disc on 22 August 1995. It is the second and last of Osbourne's albums to feature lead guitarist Jake E. Lee, and the first to feature drummer Randy Castillo and bassist Phil Soussan, who co-wrote the album's hit single "Shot in the Dark".

The album was awarded Platinum status in May 1986 and was awarded Double Platinum status in October 1994 by the RIAA.

Overview
Upon returning from the Betty Ford Center in 1985 where he had undergone treatment for substance abuse, Osbourne was presented with a substantial quantity of music written by guitarist Jake E. Lee. After having been cheated out of his writing and publishing claims for Osbourne's previous album, 1983's Bark at the Moon, Lee says this time he refused to contribute anything until he had a contract in front of him guaranteeing his writing credit and publishing rights. Much of this music would form the basis of the album. The album's lyrics were largely written by long-time Osbourne bassist and lyricist Bob Daisley. Daisley left the band prior to recording after having a disagreement with Osbourne, prompting the hiring of Phil Soussan as his replacement. Daisley was not credited for his songwriting contributions on the initial 1986 pressing of the album, though this was corrected on subsequent pressings.

Future Y&T and Megadeth drummer Jimmy DeGrasso worked with Lee and Daisley on demos for the album, but this version of the band fell apart due to Osbourne's commitment to the Black Sabbath summer 1985 reunion concert at Live Aid; Castillo and Soussan ultimately replaced DeGrasso and Daisley once recording commenced.

The working title for the album was Killer of Giants after the album's song of the same name. Osbourne opted to change the title to The Ultimate Sin at the last minute. On 1 April 1986, a live performance promoting the album in Kansas City, Missouri, was filmed and released later that year as the home video The Ultimate Ozzy. In 1987, after the various tours in support of the album had concluded, guitarist Lee was unexpectedly fired by Osbourne's wife and manager Sharon. The specific justification for Lee's dismissal remains unknown. Bassist Soussan also departed, with Bob Daisley once again entering the fold.

Reception
At the time of its release, The Ultimate Sin was Osbourne's highest-charting studio album, as heavy metal was enjoying a surge in popularity during the mid-1980s. The RIAA awarded the album Platinum status on 14 May 1986, soon after its release; it was awarded Double Platinum status on 26 October 1994. The album sold over 2,000,000 copies worldwide. In the UK, it was the final of four Osbourne albums to attain Silver certification (60,000 units shipped) by the British Phonographic Industry, achieving this in April 1986.

Despite its commercial success, Osbourne cites The Ultimate Sin as his least favorite solo album, saying "If there was ever an album I'd like to remix and do better, it would be The Ultimate Sin." Much of the vocalist's blame has been placed on the shoulders of producer Ron Nevison, saying "(He) didn't really do a great production job. The songs weren't bad, they were just put down weird. Everything felt and sounded the fucking same. There was no imagination."

Availability

Despite being one of Osbourne's most successful solo albums, The Ultimate Sin was the only album among Osbourne's back catalog to not be reissued or remastered in 2002. Though no official reason was given, rumors circulated that an ongoing legal struggle with bassist/songwriter Phil Soussan over his song "Shot in the Dark" was responsible for the album's failure to be re-issued. The only available CD version of The Ultimate Sin remains the 1995 remastered version, which is missing four measures of music between the first chorus and second verse of "Shot in the Dark" found on the original CDs, vinyl copies, and cassettes.

Track listing

Shot in the Dark runs 4:28 on the original vinyl and CD issues. The 1995 CD reissue uses the 4:16 single edit.

Personnel
Ozzy Osbourne – vocals
Jake E. Lee – guitars
Phil Soussan – bass
Randy Castillo – drums

Additional performers
Mike Moran – keyboards

Production
Produced and engineered by Ron Nevison
Additional engineers – Martin White, Richard Moakes
Remastered by Brian Lee with Bob Ludwig (1995 reissue)

Charts

Weekly charts

Year-end charts

Singles

Certifications

See also
 List of anti-war songs (Killer of Giants track on the list)

References

External links
 
 Official Ozzy Osbourne website

1986 albums
Ozzy Osbourne albums
Albums produced by Ron Nevison
Epic Records albums
Albums with cover art by Boris Vallejo